For information on all Iona College sports, see Iona Gaels

The Iona Gaels softball team represents Iona College in NCAA Division I college softball.  The team participates in the Metro Atlantic Athletic Conference (MAAC). The Gaels are currently led by head coach  Alyssa Tiumalu. The team plays its home games at the Donald E. Walsh field at Rice Oval located on the college's campus.

See also
List of NCAA Division I softball programs

References

Donald E. Walsh Field at Rice Oval
https://icgaels.com/news/2014/4/27/209482901.aspx?path=softball

External links